The rockweed gunnel (Apodichthys fucorum), also known as the Fucus blenny, is a species of marine ray-finned fish belonging to the family Pholidae, the gunnels. This species is found in the eastern North Pacific Ocean.

Taxonomy
The rockweed gunnel was first formally described in 1880 by the American ichthyologists David Starr Jordan and Charles Henry Gilbert with its type locality given as Point Pinos, near Monterey, California. The specific name fucorum means “belonging to Fucus, the brown algae which forms a frequent habitat for this species.

Description
The rockweed gunnel has a translucent body which varies in color from bright green to a reddish-brown and tis color is determined by their environment. Fish living among green seaweed are green and fish living among brown seaweed are reddish brown. It has a long, thin eel-like body with small fins, each roughly equal in size to the diameter of their eye and too small to be used in swimming. The spine in the anal fin has a length which is 40% of the length of the head and has a sharp point, tilted forward. This fish has83 or 84 spinesin its dorsal fin  and a single spine and between 32 and 38 soft rays in its anal fin. It has a rounded caudal fin.

Distribution and habitat
The rockweed gunnel is found along the eastern Pacific Ocean from Banks Island, British Columbia in the north, to Punta Escarpada, central Baja California, Mexico.in the south. It commonly occurs in tide pools and inshore areas among masses of brown seaweed in the genus fucus, also known as 'rockweed'.

Biology
The rockweed gunnel’s diet consists of mollusks and small species of crustaceans. Rockweed gunnels are able to survive when exposed at low tide because they can breathe air, being able to survive for up to 20 hours outside of water, so long as there is sufficient moisture.

References

Rockweed gunnel
Fish described in 1880